Lestes macrostigma is a species of damselfly of the family Lestidae, the spreadwings. It is known by the common name dark spreadwing. It is native to much of southern Europe, its distribution extending into western Asia.

Description
This species is up to 48 millimeters long. It is similar to other common Lestes species but it is darker in color with more blue pruinescence. The pterostigmata are large and black.

Distribution
This species has a wide distribution extending from the western coastlines of Europe into Central Asia and the Middle East. Much of its European range is in the Mediterranean. Its distribution is fragmented. It is more abundant in the eastern parts of its range, but abundance varies according to climate and weather. In some areas it is common and in others it is rare and sometimes endangered.

It is most common around brackish waters, like coastal estuaries and salty inland lakes.

Biology
This species has often been noted to lay its eggs on saltmarsh bulrush (Bolboschoenus maritimus). It will also utilize sea bulrush (Juncus maritimus) and common clubrush (Schoenoplectus lacustris).

After mating, the female usually seeks oviposition sites with the male still attached to her. She then lays a line of eggs in the fibers of the aquatic plant. The ovipositor has a cutting implement and sensory setae.

See also 
 List of damselflies of the world (Lestidae)

References

Further reading
 Askew, R. R. (2004). The Dragonflies of Europe. (revised ed.) Harley Books. pp 58–66. 
 d'Aguilar, J., Dommanget, J. L., and Prechac, R. (1986). A Field Guide to the Dragonflies of Britain, Europe and North Africa. Collins. pp 168–178. 
 Boudot J. P., et al. (2009). Atlas of the Odonata of the Mediterranean and North Africa. Libellula Supplement 9:1-256.
 Dijkstra, K. & Lewington, R. (2006). Field Guide to the Dragonflies of Britain and Europe. British Wildlife Publishing. .

M
Damselflies of Europe
Odonata of Asia
Insects of the Middle East
Insects of Central Asia
Least concern biota of Asia

Insects described in 1836